John Michael Elliott Hinton (4 July 1923 – 3 February 2000) was a British philosopher. He was a lecturer at the University of Oxford from 1958 and a fellow of Worcester College, Oxford, from 1960. He was Cowling Visiting Professor at Carleton College in 1978-79. He was previously a lecturer at Victoria University College.

Hinton is widely cited as the first modern proponent of the disjunctive theory of perception. This view is set out in his 1973 book Experiences: An Inquiry Into Some Ambiguities, and in some papers dating as far back as 1966.

Bibliography
J. M. Hinton "Seeing and Causes", Philosophy, Oct 1966
J. M. Hinton "Visual Experiences", Mind, Vol lxxvi, No 302, April 1967, pp. 217–227
J. M. Hinton (1967) "Experiences" Philosophical Quarterly 17 (66):1-13.
J. Michael Hinton  "Perception and Identification", Philosophical Review 76, October 1967, pp. 421–435.
I. C. Hinckfuss "J.M. Hinton on Visual Experiences" Mind 79 April 1970 pp. 278–280.
J. M.Hinton "A Reaction to Radical Philosophy", Radical Philosophy 2, Summer 1972, p. 24
J. M. Hinton "Visual Experiences: A Reply to I.C. Hinckfuss" Mind 82 (April 1973) pp. 278–279.
J. M. Hinton Experiences (1973), Clarendon Press, Oxford 
J. Michael Hinton "This is Visual Sensation" in Renford Bambrough (ed.) "Wisdom: Twelve Essays", Oxford Blackwell, 1974.
J. M. Hinton "Phenomenological Specimenism", Analysis Vol. 40 No.1, Jan 1980, pp. 37–41 
J. M. Hinton "Are They Class-names?", Philosophy 57, 1982, pp. 27–50
Paul Snowdon, "Hinton and the Origins of Disjunctivism", in "Disjunctivism: Perception, Action, Knowledge" ed. by Adrian Haddock and Fiona Macpherson, Oxford: OUP, 2008, pp. 35–56.

References

External links
A picture of Hinton when he was at Victoria

1923 births
2000 deaths
Fellows of Worcester College, Oxford
Academic staff of the Victoria University of Wellington
20th-century British philosophers